Boom may refer to:

Objects
 Boom (containment), a temporary floating barrier used to contain an oil spill
 Boom (navigational barrier), an obstacle used to control or block marine navigation
 Boom (sailing), a sailboat part
 Boom (windsurfing), a piece of windsurfing equipment
 Boom (ship), a type of Arab sailing vessel
 Log boom, a barrier placed in a river
 Boom, the lifting part of a crane
 Boom microphone
 Boom, the rear fuselage of an aircraft, as in twin boom
 Boom, short for boomerang
 Boom barrier, used to block vehicular or pedestrian access

Arts and entertainment

Music

Performers 
 Boom! (band), a pop band founded by Hear'Say member Johnny Shentall
 The Boom, a Japanese rock band
 Boom Gaspar (born 1953), piano/keyboard/organ player for the band Pearl Jam
Boom, a member of the animated girl group VBirds

Albums 
 Boom (The Sonics album), 1966
 Boom (Mario Pavone album), 2004
 Boom (Garmonbozia album)
 Boom, a 2006 album by The Fuzztones

Songs 
 "Boom" (Anastacia song), the official song for the 2002 FIFA World Cup
 "Boom" (Mario song), a 2005 R&B single featuring Juvenile
 "Boom" (P.O.D. song), 2002
 "Boom" (Royce da 5'9" song)
 "Boom" (Snoop Dogg song), 2011
 "Boom" (T-Pain song), 2008, with Filip Filippi, better known as Sin Sizzerb
 "Boom" (X Ambassadors song), 2019
 "Boom", a song by Anjulie, 2008
 "Boom", a song by the Bloodhound Gang from One Fierce Beer Coaster (1996)
 "Boom", a song by Flight of the Conchords from the 2007 episode "Bret Gives Up the Dream"
 "Boom!", a song by Lil Yachty featuring Ugly God from the 2018 album Lil Boat 2
 "Boom", a 2008 song by gospel R&B duo Mary Mary from the album The Sound
 "Boom", a song by Soulfly on the album Primitive
 "Boom!", a song by System of a Down from their 2002 album Steal This Album!
 "Boom!", a song by Simple Plan from their 2016 album Taking One for the Team
 "Boom", a song by YoungBoy Never Broke Again from his 2020 album Top

Festivals 
 Boom Festival, an electronic music festival in Portugal
 BOOM Festival, a former Yugoslav music festival

Films
 Boom! (film), a 1968 British drama starring Elizabeth Taylor, Richard Burton and Noël Coward
 Boom (film), a 2003 Bollywood comedy
 Il Boom, a 1963 film by Italian director Vittorio de Sica

Television
 Boom! (TV series), a 2005 American reality series
 Boom! (game show), an American game show with a time bomb theme
 Boom, the original title of the U.S. TV series Blood & Oil
 "Boom" (CSI), an episode of the TV series C.S.I.: Crime Scene Investigation
 "Boom!" (Castle), a television episode
 "BOOM" (Agents of S.H.I.E.L.D.), a television episode
 Boom (Power Rangers), a character from the American TV series Power Rangers: S.P.D.

Other
 Boom! Studios, an American comics publisher
 Boom! (novel), a 2009 children's science fiction novel by Mark Haddon
 Boom (play), by Peter Sinn Nachtreib
 Boom (source port), a source port of the computer game Doom

Places 
 Boom, Belgium, a municipality
 Boom Mountain, on the border between Alberta and British Columbia, Canada
 Boom Lake, near the mountain
 Boom Gorge, on the Chu River in Kyrgyzstan
 Boom, Tennessee, a community in the United States
 Boom, Texas, former name of Summerfield, Texas

Media 
 BOOMTV, a proposed Canadian premium TV service
 Boom TV (Romania), a satellite TV company
 Boom TV (Macedonia), a digital TV provider
 Boom! Studios, an American comic book and graphic novel publisher
 Boom FM, a classic hits radio station brand in Canada
 Boom Radio, a UK radio station
 KROI, a radio station serving the Greater Houston area, branded as "Boom 92"
 XERP-AM, a Mexican radio station serving the Tampico, Tamaulipas area, branded as "boom 104.7"
 WPHI-FM, a radio station serving the Philadelphia area, branded as "Boom 107.9"

People 
 Boom (surname)
 Boom (nickname)
 Boom (entertainer) (born 1982), South Korean rapper, singer and actor

Other uses
 Sonic boom, the sound created by an object traveling through the air faster than the speed of sound
 Economic boom, a time of rapid growth in wealth, as in a boom town
 Baby boom, a period marked by a greatly increased birth rate

Organizations 
 Boom Technology, a startup aircraft company

See also 
 Latin American Boom, a 1960s literary movement
 Bang (disambiguation)
 Boom Boom (disambiguation)
 Boomer (disambiguation)
 Boum (disambiguation)